Harry Stiller  (28 May 1938 – 13 May 2018) was a British racing driver and British Formula Three Champion. His racing career covered the years between 1958 and 1969 and he drove a variety of different classes of cars. After stopping driving himself he became an entrant in 1970 and he had cars in Formula Three, Formula Atlantic, F5000 and in 1975, Formula One. After racing he became creator, developer and operator of Tucktonia, a south-coast leisure park in the 1970s and 1980s. He was also a director of the Rob Walker Motor Group in the UK during the 1970s and the owner of Harry Stiller Motor Cars on Wilshire Boulevard, in Beverly Hills, California, also in the 1970s, with agencies for Fiat, Lancia and Lotus and for leasing Rolls-Royce and Bentley motor cars in Los Angeles. During the early 1980s, he was a pioneer of the pound shop concept in the North East of England and opened units in Scarborough, Newcastle upon Tyne, Stockton and moved into the South as well with another five units along the South Coast and one in Hatfield.

This was not the first time Jones had driven for Stiller as he had done so in the works March Formula Atlantic car in the 1974 UK John Player championship.

Stiller was a life member of the British Racing Drivers' Club (BRDC), and lived in Christchurch, Dorset, England with his wife Annie.

Racing career
Double British F3 Champion in 1966 and 1967 (joint holder of the highest number of wins in one F3 season with Ayrton Senna).
European Cup captain of the British F3 team in 1968.
Works F2 driver for Cooper, Lola and Merlyn.
Drove at Le Mans in 1962 and 1967.

Non-Championship Formula One results
(key)

Complete Formula One World Championship results (as entrant)
(key)

References

1938 births
2018 deaths
British Formula Three Championship drivers
English racing drivers
Formula One team owners
Formula One team principals
People from Christchurch, Dorset
Sportspeople from Dorset